Tiffany Flynn (born 2 September 1995) is an American athlete who competes in the long jump.

A former student at Mississippi State University,
Flynn made her major championship debut in 2022 both indoor and outdoor. She finished fourth at the 2022 World Athletics Indoor Championships in Belgrade with a jump of 6.78. Finishing third at the US national championship in June 2022 earned Flynn a place at the 2022 World Athletics Championships in Eugene, Oregon where Flynn qualified for the final.

References

1995 births
Living people
African-American female track and field athletes
World Athletics Championships athletes for the United States
21st-century African-American sportspeople
American female long jumpers